Toqoz-e Olya (also Romanized as Toqoz-e ‘Olyā; also known as Tūqoz-e Bālā) is a village in Jamrud Rural District, in the Central District of Torbat-e Jam County, Razavi Khorasan Province, Iran. At the 2006 census, its population was 398, in 87 families.

References 

Populated places in Torbat-e Jam County